Foyn Harbor is an anchorage between Nansen Island and Enterprise Island in Wilhelmina Bay, off the west coast of Graham Land, Antarctica. It was surveyed by M.C. Lester and T.W. Bagshawe in 1921–22, and was named by whalers in the area after the whaling factory Svend Foyn, which was moored here during 1921–22.

References 

 

Ports and harbours of Graham Land
Danco Coast